Julian Gough (born 1966) is an English-Irish musician who was the singer and lyricist for the Galway band Toasted Heretic, and is best known for his songs "Galway and Los Angeles", "You can Always go Home" and "LSD (isn't what it used to be)", as well as writing the end poem of Minecraft, which he released into the public domain, under CC0 1.0 Universal, in December 2022.

Since Toasted Heretic's early 1990s break-up, Gough has established a career as satirist, novelist and writer of children's books.

Career
Gough grew up near Heathrow Airport in London, before moving to Nenagh aged seven. He was studying English and philosophy at University College Galway in the late 1980s when he and some friends founded Toasted Heretic. The band recorded four albums and had one top-10 hit, "Galway and Los Angeles", in 1992. Gough's first novel, Juno & Juliet, was published in 2001 by Flamingo, almost a decade after Toasted Heretic split up. His second novel, Jude: Level 1, was published in 2007 at Old Street Publishing, shortly after he won the 2007 National Short Story Award for the book's first chapter, titled "The Orphan and the Mob".

In 2010, Salmon Poetry released Gough's first poetry collection, Free Sex Chocolate, which juxtaposes Gough's more recent forays into poetry with his earlier lyrics written for Toasted Heretic. He is also the author of several short stories and novellas that satirize global economic policies, including 2003's Great Hargeisa Goat Bubble and CRASH! How I Lost a Hundred Billion and Found True Love. In 2015, Gough signed a book deal with Picador.

In November 2011, Gough was invited by Markus Persson, creator of Minecraft, to create a story for the ending of the game, in preparation for its release. Despite being an iconic part of the game, the poem has garnered mixed reception; Kevin Thielenhaus, writing for The Escapist, called the ending "mysterious, and kind of weird, and probably not what most of us were expecting from a Minecraft ending." while an article in The Atlantic, written by James Parker, called the ending both "goofy" and "beautiful". Gough would also later go on to refer to the poem as "peculiar" in an article he wrote in The Irish Times. On December 7, 2022, he revealed on multiple sites including Reddit and Twitter that he would be officially releasing the End Poem into the public domain, as he never signed a contract with Microsoft or Mojang.

Gough writes columns and opinion pieces for various newspapers and magazines, including The Guardian,
Prospect Magazine and A Public Space. His novel Jude in London came third in the 2011 Guardian Not The Booker prize after the author threatened to share pictures of him "wearing only the [Not The Booker trophy] mug" should he win the competition.

Publications
 I Totes Love the Christian Brothers (Self-published)
 Juno & Juliet (Flamingo) 
 Jude: Level 1 (Old Street) 
 Free Sex Chocolate (Salmon Poetry) 
 Jude in London (Old Street) 
 CONNECT a novel (Doubleday) 
 Trapped in a Stephen King Story: My Spiraling Descent into Madness (Macmillan, forthcoming)

References

External links 

 

Living people
21st-century Irish male writers
21st-century Irish poets
21st-century Irish short story writers
1966 births
Alumni of the University of Galway
Irish columnists
Irish humorists
Irish male poets
Irish male short story writers